The deputy premier of Manitoba is a Cabinet minister in the province of Manitoba, Canada. The position has existed for several years, but only appears to have become a full-fledged Cabinet portfolio in 1988. Between 2009 and 2011, the position was held by both Eric Robinson and Rosann Wowchuk; from 2015 to 2016, it was held by both Eric Robinson and Kerri Irvin-Ross. The current deputy premier is Cliff Cullen under Premier Heather Stefanson.

The minister fulfills the responsibilities of the premier of Manitoba, at times when the premier is absent. The deputy premier is not a constitutionally defined role and has no formal place in the line of succession to the premier of Manitoba.

List of deputy premiers of Manitoba

Source:

See also
 Premier (Canada)
 List of Manitoba premiers
 Executive Council of Manitoba

Manitoba ministers